1986–87 Albanian Cup was the thirty-fifth season of Albania's annual cup competition. It began in August 1986 with the First Round and ended in May 1987 with the Final matches. The winners of the competition qualified for the 1987-88 first round of the UEFA Europa League. 17 Nëntori were the defending champions, having won their seventh Albanian Cup last season. The cup was won by Vllaznia.

The rounds were played in a two-legged format similar to those of European competitions. If the aggregated score was tied after both games, the team with the higher number of away goals advanced. If the number of away goals was equal in both games, the match was decided by extra time and a penalty shootout, if necessary.

First round
Games were played on August, 1986.

|}

Second round
Games were played on January, 1987.

|}

Quarter-finals
In this round entered the 8 winners from the previous round. Games were played on February, 1987.

|}

Semi-finals
In this round entered the four winners from the previous round. Games were played on April, 2000.

|}

Finals
In this round entered the two winners from the previous round. Games were played on May, 1987.

|}

First leg

Second leg

References

 Calcio Mondiale Web

External links
 Official website 

Cup
1986–87 domestic association football cups
1986-87